The Silvanigrellales are an order of the phylum Bdellovibrionota. They include currently only the single family Silvanigrellaceae.

References

External links
 Silvanigrellales - J.P. Euzéby: List of Prokaryotic names with Standing in Nomenclature

Oligoflexia